God's Sentence is an unfinished Brazilian film project developed between 1954 and 1956, directed by José Mojica Marins. Marins is also known by his alter ego Zé do Caixão (in English, Coffin Joe). The film was restored into a complete format in 2007 by Portal Heco de Cinema de Brasil.

Synopsis
Antonio, desperate man who cannot maintain a job to support his mother, Dona Lídia, and his sister Marta, after his father, a banker and patriarchal head of the family, is killed. Later, he boards a group of criminals who plan a robbery and they want and him to be the driver.

The production of the film was interrupted after some problems, including the death of actress Conchita Espanhol.

Cast
 Aldenoura de Sá Porto
 Conchita Espanhol
 José Mojica Marins
 Nancy Montez
 Rosita Soler

References

External links 
 Official film site
 
 Sentença de Deus on Portal Heco de Cinema

1950s unfinished films
Brazilian drama films
Films directed by José Mojica Marins
1950s Portuguese-language films